Babets v. Johnston was a landmark Massachusetts Supreme Judicial Court case that affirmed the rights of same-sex couples to adopt children.

Background 
Don Babets and David Jean were a gay couple living together in Massachusetts. In 1984 the pair applied with the state Department of Social Services to become foster parents. The state began a lengthy evaluation process, including a detailed background check, conversations with their friends and colleagues, and consultation with the pair's priest. The placement was approved in April of 1985 and Babets and Jean became foster parents to two children, both brothers. The placement was approved by both the state and the children's biological mother. On May 8, 1985, The Boston Globe ran an article alleging community opposition to the two becoming foster parents. One day later, on May 9, the state removed the children from their household.

Massachusetts Governor Michael Dukakis initiated a policy review to determine whether gay couples should be allowed to be foster parents while Philip Johnston, the head of human services, started his own review. The policy reviews resulted in the state adopting a slate of new rules relating to foster parenting, including that children only be placed in "traditional family settings," that potential foster parents disclose their sexuality to the state, and that existing gay foster parents subject themselves to a biannual review process. Babets and Jean, represented by the ACLU and GLAD, filed suit against the state. They were joined in the lawsuit by two other foster parents and the National Association of Social Workers. The lawsuit challenged the new regulations, alleging that the updated rules violated the rights to equal protection and due process.

Proceedings 
As the case developed, the state of Massachusetts refused to provide documents describing the lead-up to the policy's adoption, claiming that they were protected by "executive privilege." In 1988, the Supreme Judicial Court ruled that no such protection existed under state law and ordered the state to supply any such documents. The documents revealed that Dukakis had personally directed the state human services department to prevent gay couples from fostering and that he had cited political concerns as the primary motivation.In 1990 the state settled, agreeing to return to a "best interests of the child" standard and to remove any requirements relating to sexuality.

Legacy 
Despite the state eventually settling, the children were never returned to Babets and Jean. In 1995, the couple adopted four children and received a note of congratulations from the Massachusetts General Court, which had voted to ban gay foster parents in 1985.

Michael Dukakis' role in the lawsuit attracted criticism from both the Democratic Party and LGBTQ organizations. During the 1988 Democratic Party presidential primaries, protestors were a regular sight at Dukakis' campaign rallies.

References 

American Civil Liberties Union litigation
Massachusetts Supreme Judicial Court cases
United States LGBT rights case law